Emily Hall (born 1978) is a composer of classical music, electronica and songs.  Her music has been performed by the Duke Quartet, the London Symphony Orchestra, the Brodsky Quartet, the London Sinfonietta, and the Philharmonia; it has been broadcast on BBC Radio 3, BBC Radio 4 and France Culture. Roxanna Panufnik said of her (and 21st century female classical composers in general): "Hip young things like Tansy Davies and Emily Hall will exert a great influence on the new music scene in the next ten years."

Biography
Hall read music at the University of York then studied orchestration with Yan Maresz in Paris. She studied with Julian Anderson for her Masters in Composition at the Royal College of Music.  She is a founding member of c3, the Camberwell Composers Collective.  Hall is a member of  Bedroom Community, an Icelandic record label/collective. Her music is formed from close relationships with singers and writers and she seeks her own ways of using technology and live performance. Hall has received the Paul Hamlyn Foundation Award for Artists (2013), the Genesis Opera Prize (2006) and the Royal Philharmonic Society Composition Award (2005).

The world premiere of her opera Sante took place on Wednesday 24 May 2006, co-produced by Aldeburgh Productions and the London Sinfonietta, directed by Tim Supple. It utilised African melody and rhythm.

Her one-act opera Found and Lost premiered in January 2016 at the Corinthia Hotel in London.

Folie à Deux (2015) is a collaboration with Icelandic writer and long-time Björk collaborator Sjón. It is conceived both as a concept album and an opera and utilises a newly created instrument called the electro-magnetic harp which uses vibrating magnets.

Works

Vocal music
Befalling (song cycle): 20 minutes. Commissioned by Faster than Sound. First performance: Robert Murray and Malcom Martineau, June 2007, Aldeburgh Church
A Simple Neo-Georgian Summer setting of Toby Litt. Recorded by NMC
5 new songs for Baritone: 20 minutes. First performance: Paul Carey Jones, September 2010, Grimsby St Hugh's Festival
Life Cycle (song cycle): 45 minutes. Commissioned by Opera North. First performance: Mara Carlyle, Oliver Coates and John Reid, March 2011, Southbank Centre
3 new songs for Matt Sharp after Dichterliebe. First performance: Matthew Sharp, February 2012, Astor Theatre, Deal
Rest (song cycle): 45 minutes. First performance: Lady Maisery, June 2013, Hoxton Hall (Spitalfields Music Summer Festival)
The Bells of Aberdovey. Commissioned by the London Sinfonietta. First performance: London Sinfonietta, May 2015, Southbank Centre
We are passengers. Commissioned by Spitalfields Music. First performance: Women sing East, June 2015, Shoreditch Church (Spitalfields Music Summer Festival)
Veins (2020). Commissioned by BBC for the BBC Singers.

Opera
Sante: 70 minutes. First performance: Aldeburgh Productions/London Sinfonietta, May 2006, LSO St Luke's
The Nightingale and the Rose: 9 minutes. Commissioned by Streetwise Opera. First performance: December 2010, Shoreditch Church (Spitalfields Music Winter Festival)
Folie à Deux: 50 minutes. Commissioned by Mahogany Opera Group. First performance: March 2015, Bergen, Norway (Borealis Festival)
 Found and Lost. Premiered in January and February 2016 at the Corinthia Hotel London, where Hall was artist in residence.

String quartets
time back for time given: 5 minutes. First performance: Duke Quartet, June 2004, Cheltenham Music Festival
braid: 6 minutes. First performance: Brodsky Quartet, July 2007, Lichfield Cathedral (Lichfield Festival)
from listening to trees: 11 minutes. First performance: Barbirolli Quartet, October 2008, Haslemere

Orchestral
Plinth: 5.5 minutes. First performance: London Symphony Orchestra, November 2007, Barbican
Put Flesh On! (cello, electronics and orchestra): 12 minutes. First performance: London Contemporary Orchestra, Oliver Coates and Sound Intermedia, October 2008

Instrumental
Chatelet: 5 minutes. First performance: November 2003, Southbank Centre
no currency (piano): 6.5 minutes. First performance: Sarah Nichols, June 2006, Blue Elephant Theatre
Put Flesh On! (cello and electronics): 8 minutes. First performance: Oliver Coates, June 2008, Faster than Sound
Amnio (piano): 5 minutes. Commissioned by BBC Radio 3. First performance: Andrew Zolinsky, February 2009, BBC Radio 3 
for zoe (cello): 5 minutes. First performance: Zoe Martlew, The Crypt Camberwell

Small chamber
join: (bassoon or cor anglais and piano or flute and harp): 6 minutes. First performance: c3, 2004
cry baby (2 electric guitars): 5 minutes. First performance: c3, November 2005
how we begin to remember (trumpet, accordion, double bass): 6 minutes. First performance: c3, November 2006
hotel twiga (percussion and accordion): 5 minutes. First performance: c3, November 2006
26 horsepower (clarinet, viola, piano): 5 minutes. First performance: c3, November 2007

Large chamber
think about space: 5 minutes. First performance: London Sinfonietta, 2005
26 Horsepower: 6.5 minutes.  First performance: St Paul's Sinfonia, November, 2007

Recordings
Befalling (2013) — Nearfield Music
Folie à Deux (2015) — Bedroom Community

References

External links

Norman Records review of Folie a Deux

Hall's bio for Faster than Sound 2008 at the Aldeburgh Festival

1978 births
Living people
British women classical composers
21st-century classical composers
Alumni of the Royal College of Music
Alumni of the University of York
21st-century women composers